Roy Wilford Riegle (April 27, 1896 – February 2, 1988), known as Wilford, was an American attorney, politician and Member of the Kansas House of Representatives.

He met his future wife, Keith, while attending Kansas State Normal School during the 1910s. Before marriage, however, he was called to duty during World War I as part of the United States Army in Company L, 137th Infantry, 35th Division.

Aside from serving as the longest-practicing attorney in Lyons County, Wilford was a Republican member of both the Kansas House of Representatives and the Kansas Senate for multiple terms.

In 1973, he took office as the Grand Master of the Knights Templar (Freemasonry) both nationally and overseas.

After a series of strokes and declining health, Colonel Riegle died on February 2, 1988.

References

Republican Party members of the Kansas House of Representatives
1896 births
1988 deaths
20th-century American politicians
Republican Party Kansas state senators
Washburn University alumni
Emporia State University alumni
United States Army personnel of World War I